Astley Community High School is a coeducational upper school (styled high school) and sixth form located in Seaton Delaval in the English county of Northumberland.

It is a community school administered by Northumberland County Council, and admits pupils from Seaton Valley, particularly those graduating from  Whytrig and Seaton Sluice Middle Schools. In 2022 plans were approved to relocate the school to a new campus within Seaton Delaval. The new campus will be shared with Whytrig Middle School.

Astley Community High School offers GCSEs and BTECs as programmes of study for pupils, while students in the sixth form have the option to study from a range of A-levels and further BTECs. The school also offers the Duke of Edinburgh's Award programme.

References

External links
Astley Community High School official website

Upper schools in Northumberland
Community schools in Northumberland